Jolanda Saling (born 16 January 1980) is a Surinamese retired footballer who played as a forward. She has been a member of the Suriname women's national team.

International career
Saling capped for Suriname at senior level during two CONCACAF Women's Olympic Qualifying Tournament qualifications (2008 and 2012) and the 2010 CONCACAF Women's World Cup Qualifying qualification.

International goals
Scores and results list Suriname's goal tally first

References

1980 births
Living people
Surinamese women's footballers
Women's association football forwards
Suriname women's international footballers